Vivid is the debut studio album by American band Living Colour, released on May 3, 1988, through Epic Records. It was one of the most popular albums of 1988, peaking at number six on the US Billboard 200 chart and being certified double platinum by the Recording Industry Association of America.

Music
Vivid has been described as a hard rock, funk metal, alternative metal, heavy metal, and funk rock album, with elements of funk, soul, jazz, avant-garde jazz, arena rock, pop, punk rock, and rap.

Critical reception

In The Philadelphia Inquirer, Ken Tucker commented that Living Colour "defies musical stereotypes by evincing influences that include Lynyrd Skynyrd, Jimi Hendrix, Roxy Music and Sly Stone to yield a fierce, funny album." Mark Sinker of NME likewise highlighted the band's diversity of influences, including their embrace of older musical styles "that even metal heads haven't taken seriously", and concluded that Vivid "lives up, simultaneously, to the pinhead directness of Zeppelin and the total Texas-New Yorker strangeness of Ornette Coleman's Prime Time." "In its own way," wrote Rolling Stone critic David Fricke, "Vivid is an open letter to rock & roll itself, a demand for equal time and respect from a music that is Living Colour's birthright." He added that the album "will not change the world single-handedly, but it's a timely reminder of why it's always worth trying." Robert Christgau was less enthusiastic in The Village Voice, finding that "while it's momentarily exhilarating to hear this all-black band come power-chording out of the box, after a while the fancy arrangements and strained soul remind me of, I don't know, Megadeth."

Among retrospective appraisals, AllMusic reviewer Greg Prato deemed Vivid "one of the finest hard rock albums of the '80s – and for that matter, all time." In Blender, Michael Azerrad recalled that the notion of "four black musicians playing heavy metal" made Vivid "newsworthy", while adding that as "the black-rock trend never panned out", years after the album's release Living Colour's chief legacy lies in its music, noting Vivids "landmark" fusion of "hardcore, funk and avant-jazz." J. D. Considine, writing for the 2004 edition of The Rolling Stone Album Guide, was most impressed by how Living Colour "backs its musical vision with insight, offering pointed, perceptive social commentary through songs such as 'Funny Vibe' and 'Open Letter (To a Landlord).'" Calling Vivid "a crucial document in Black rock music", Pitchforks Stuart Berman opined that the album's legacy endures through later artists who have "flowed through the cracks in the industry barriers that Vivid breached, and, in their own unique ways, have each inherited the mission of reclaiming Black creators' frontline position at rock's vanguard, both under- and above-ground." Vivid is featured in the book 1001 Albums You Must Hear Before You Die.

Awards and accolades
Grammy Awards

Track listing

(Note: Track 10 runs 3:56 on original CD issues, and 1:41 on original vinyl and remastered CD issues.)

Personnel
Living Colour
Corey Glover – vocals
Vernon Reid – guitars
Muzz Skillings – bass
Will Calhoun – drums

Additional personnel
Mick Jagger – harmonica on track 8, backing vocals on track 9
Chuck D – rapping on track 6
Flavor Flav – social commentary on track 6
The Fowler Family – additional backing vocals on tracks 2 and 5
Dennis Diamond – carnival barker on track 8

Production
Ed Stasium – producer and engineer on tracks 1-8 and 10, mixing on tracks 9 and 11
Mick Jagger – producer on tracks 9 and 11
Ron St. Germain – engineer on tracks 9 and 11
Paul Hamingson – engineer on tracks 1-8 and 10, mixing
Danny Mormando, Debi Cornish, Stephen Immerwahr, Mike McMackin, Tom Durack, U.E. Natasi – assistant engineers
Greg Calbi – mastering

Charts

Weekly charts

Year-end charts

Singles

Certifications

References

External links
"Vivid" at Discogs

Living Colour albums
1988 debut albums
Albums produced by Ed Stasium
Albums produced by Mick Jagger
Epic Records albums
Heavy metal albums by American artists